The World's in Love (German: Die ganze Welt dreht sich um Liebe) is a 1935 Austrian comedy film directed by Viktor Tourjansky and starring Mártha Eggerth, Leo Slezak and Ida Wüst. It is based on the operetta Clo-Clo.

The film's sets were designed by the art director Julius von Borsody. It was remade in Britain the following year as Dreams Come True.

Cast

Critical reception
Writing for The Spectator in 1936, Graham Greene gave the film a neutral review, describing it as a "devastatingly gay film". Greene praised the comedic interplay between Leo Slezak and Hans Moser, however he designed to praise Mártha Eggerth for her performance explaining that he had a peculiar antipathy toward her acting.

See also
 Dreams Come True (1936)

References

Bibliography 
 Waldman, Harry. Nazi Films in America, 1933-1942. McFarland, 2008.

External links 
 

1935 films
1935 musical comedy films
Austrian musical comedy films
1930s German-language films
Films directed by Victor Tourjansky
Films based on operettas
Operetta films
Austrian black-and-white films